O. Subramanian is an Indian politician and former Opposition Leader of the Legislative Assembly Tamil Nadu. He was elected to the Tamil Nadu legislative assembly as an Indian National Congress candidate from Sivaganga constituency in 1977 and 1984 elections and as an Indian National Congress (Indira) candidate in 1980 election.

References 

Indian National Congress politicians from Tamil Nadu
Living people
Leaders of the Opposition in Tamil Nadu
Tamil Nadu MLAs 1985–1989
Year of birth missing (living people)